Mount Mason is a peak,  high, at the edge of the Ross Ice Shelf, Antarctica, surmounting the northern extremity of Lillie Range. It was discovered and photographed by the Byrd Antarctic Expedition (1928–30) and named for Howard F. Mason, a radio engineer who wintered with that expedition at Little America.

References

Mountains of the Ross Dependency
Dufek Coast